The Huanghai N1 is a mid-size Pickup truck produced and sold by SG Automotive (曙光汽车) under the Huanghai Auto (黄海) marque.

Overview
The Huanghai N1 pickup truck debuted during the 2014 Beijing Auto Show, and was launched on the Chinese car market in May 2014.

The Huanghai N1 is available with two engines including the Mitsubishi-derived 2.4 liter four-cylinder petrol engine producing 140 hp and 200 nm of torque, and a 2.5 liter turbocharged four-cylinder diesel engine producing 100 hp and a torque of 220 nm, both mated to a 5-speed manual gearbox. Prices of the Huanghai N1 ranges from 69,800 yuan to 82,800 yuan.

Huanghai N1S
A sportier version called the Huanghai N1S was also available featuring a restyled front bumper and redesigned front grilles. Prices of the Huanghai N1S ranges from 82,800 yuan to 109,800 yuan.

Huanghai Daniu
The Huanghai Daniu (大牛, Big Buffalo) is essentially a variant of the N1 featuring a restyled front end. Dimensions are 5570mm long, 1840mm wide and 1805mm tall. The Daniu is available as 2-wheel-drive and 4-wheel-drive models with a 2.4 liter turbo gasoline engine developing 160hp and 320N·m or a 2.5 liter turbo diesel engine with 110hp and 360N·m available.

References

External links

 Huanghai N1 website

N1
Pickup trucks
2010s cars
Rear-wheel-drive vehicles
All-wheel-drive vehicles
Cars introduced in 2014
Trucks of China